Charles "Hawkeye" Whitney (born June 22, 1957) is an American former professional basketball player. After starring at North Carolina State, he was drafted by the Kansas City Kings in the first round of the 1980 NBA draft. A knee injury limited Whitney's professional career to just 70 games, and by 1989 he was homeless and addicted to cocaine.

Kidnapping and arrest
On January 26, 1996, Whitney and a juvenile kidnapped Mark D. Fabiani, the personal attorney of then-First Lady Hillary Clinton. He was arrested, tried, convicted of a felony, and sentenced to 69 months in prison.  Upon his release in 2000 he found work at the Niles Home for Children. Whitney asserted that he participated in the crime after being accused of stealing narcotics from another individual and as a way of protecting his sister whose life was threatened.

References

1957 births
Living people
All-American college men's basketball players
American men's basketball players
Basketball players from Washington, D.C.
DeMatha Catholic High School alumni
Kansas City Kings draft picks
Kansas City Kings players
NC State Wolfpack men's basketball players
Parade High School All-Americans (boys' basketball)
Shooting guards
Small forwards